Corallo is a surname. Notable people with the surname include:

 Anthony Corallo (1913–2000), Italian-American mobster
 Mark Corallo (21st century), political communications and public relations professional
 Riccardo Corallo (born 1980), Italian footballer
 Salvatore Corallo (1928–2019), Italian politician

See also

 Coralli
 Corallo (submarine)